Canning railway station (previously Custom House station) was a railway station on the Liverpool Overhead Railway.

It was opened on 6 March 1893 by the Marquis of Salisbury, originally as Custom House station, due to its nearby location to Custom House, Liverpool, which was heavily bombed during The Blitz. After Customs moved to a new building the station was renamed Canning in 1947, so as not to confuse passengers. Providing access to Custom House and a number of other busy work locations, Canning was one of the busiest stations on the railway.

The station closed, along with the rest of the line on 30 December 1956. No evidence of this station remains.

References

Sources

External links
Canning railway station at Disused Stations

Disused railway stations in Liverpool
Former Liverpool Overhead Railway stations
Railway stations in Great Britain opened in 1893
Railway stations in Great Britain closed in 1956